Habib Lakhal (born 1 January 1961) is a Tunisian wrestler. He competed in the men's Greco-Roman 62 kg at the 1988 Summer Olympics.

References

1961 births
Living people
Tunisian male sport wrestlers
Olympic wrestlers of Tunisia
Wrestlers at the 1988 Summer Olympics
Place of birth missing (living people)